The Chairmen of the Navajo Nation was the head of the government at the formation of the Tribal Council and the government entity to interact with the Bureau of Indian Affairs.

Officeholders

See also 

 Vice President of the Navajo Nation
 Speaker of the Navajo Nation Council
 The Navajo Nation Council
 Navajo Nation presidential election, 2006
 Navajo Nation presidential election, 2010
 Navajo Nation presidential election, 2015
 Navajo Nation presidential election, 2018
 Navajo Nation presidential election, 2022

References

External links